This is a select bibliography of post World War II English language books (including translations) and journal articles about the Russo-Japanese War, the period leading up to the war, and the immediate aftermath. It specifically excludes topics related to the Russian Revolution; see Bibliography of the Russian Revolution and Civil War for information on these subjects. Book entries may have references to reviews published in academic journals or major newspapers when these could be considered helpful.

A brief selection of English translations of primary sources is included. The sections "General Surveys" and "Biographies" contain books; other sections contain both books and journal articles. Book entries have references to journal articles and reviews about them when helpful. Additional bibliographies can be found in many of the book-length works listed below; see Further Reading for several book and chapter-length bibliographies. The External Links section contains entries for publicly available select bibliographies from universities.

Inclusion criteria
Works included are referenced in the notes or bibliographies of scholarly secondary sources or journals. Included works should either be published by an academic or widely distributed publisher, be authored by a notable subject matter expert as shown by scholarly reviews and have significant scholarly journal reviews about the work. To keep the bibliography length manageable, only items that clearly meet the criteria should be included.

Citation style
This bibliography uses APA style citations. Entries do not use templates. References to reviews and notes for entries do use citation templates. Where books which are only partially related to Russian history are listed, the titles for chapters or sections should be indicated if possible, meaningful, and not excessive.

If a work has been translated into English, the translator should be included and a footnote with appropriate bibliographic information for the original language version should be included.

When listing works with titles or names published with alternative English spellings, the form used in the latest published version should be used and the version and relevant bibliographic information noted if it previously was published or reviewed under a different title.

General works
 Hall, R. C. (2004). "The Next War: The Influence of the Russo-Japanese War on Southeastern Europe and the Balkan Wars of 1912–1913". Journal of Slavic Military Studies, 17(3), pp. 563–577.
 Hanninen, O. (2022). Fear and Loathing in the Far East: Bandits, Law, and the Russo-Japanese War. Kritika: Explorations in Russian and Eurasian History, 23(2), pp.225-253.
 Katō, Y. (2007). What Caused the Russo-Japanese War: Korea or Manchuria?. Social Science Japan Journal, 10(1), pp. 95–103. 
 Kowner, R. (2010). The Impact of the Russo-Japanese War. London, UK: Routledge.
 Lensen, G. (1962). Japan and Tsarist Russia - the Changing Relationships, 1875-1917. Jahrbücher Für Geschichte Osteuropas, 10(3), neue folge, 337-348.
 Masafumi, A. (2010). The China-Russia-Japan Military Balance in Manchuria, 1906-1918. Modern Asian Studies, 44(6), pp. 1283-1311. 
 Matsui, M. (1972). The Russo-Japanese Agreement of 1907: Its Causes and the Progress of Negotiations. Modern Asian Studies, 6(1), pp. 33-48.
 Murray, N. (2013). Chapter 4: The Russo-Japanese War. In The Rocky Road to the Great War: the Evolution of Trench Warfare to 1914. Dulles, VA: Potomac Books. 
 Nish, I. (1985). The Origins of the Russo-Japanese War. London: Longman.
 Steinberg, J. (2008). Was the Russo-Japanese War World War Zero?. The Russian Review, 67(1), pp. 1–7. 
 Tomion, J. W. (1974). Strategy and Diplomacy of the Russo-Japanese War Reconsidered. Newport, RI: Naval War College.
 Van Dijk, K. (2015). The Russo-Japanese War. In Pacific Strife (pp. 417-438). Amsterdam: Amsterdam University Press.
 Walder, D. (1974), The Short Victorious War: The Russo-Japanese Conflict, 1904-5. New York: Harper & Row.

Military history
 Connaughton, R. M. (2003). The War of the Rising Sun and the Tumbling Bear — A Military History of the Russo-Japanese War 1904–5. London: Cassell.
 Hough, R. A. The Fleet That Had To Die. Ballantine Books. (1960).
 Jentschura, H., Jung, D., & Mickel, P. (1976). Warships of the Imperial Japanese Navy, 1869–1945. United States Naval Institute, Annapolis, MD. 
 Lardas, M., & Wright, P. (Illustrator). (2019). Russian Battleships and Cruisers of the Russo-Japanese War. Oxford, UK: Osprey Publishing.
 Pleshakov, C. V. (2002). The Tsar's Last Armada: The Epic Voyage to the Battle of Tsushima. New York, NY: Basic Books. 
 Stille, M., & Wright, P. (Illustrator). (2016). The Imperial Japanese Navy of the Russo-Japanese War. Oxford, UK: Osprey Publishing.

Works focused on Russia
 Esthus, R. (1981). Nicholas II and the Russo-Japanese War. The Russian Review, 40(4), pp. 396–411.
 Menning, B. (2006). Miscalculating One's Enemies: Russian Military Intelligence before the Russo-Japanese War. War in History, 13(2), pp. 141–170. 
 Papastratigakis, N. (2011). Russian Imperialism and Naval Power: Military Strategy and the Build-Up to the Russo-Japanese War. London: I. B. Tauris.
 Perabo, B. C. (2017). Russian Orthodoxy and the Russo-Japanese War. London, UK: Bloomsbury Academic.

Works focused on Japan
 Koda, Y. (2005). The Russo-Japanese War: Primary Causes of Japanese Success. Naval War College Review, 58(2), pp. 10–44. 
 Kublin, H. (1950). The Japanese Socialists and the Russo-Japanese War. The Journal of Modern History, 22(4), pp. 322-339.
 Shimazu, N. (2008). Patriotic and Despondent: Japanese Society at War, 1904-5. The Russian Review, 67(1), pp. 34-49.
 Okamoto, S. (1970). The Japanese Oligarchy and the Russo-Japanese War. New York, NY: Columbia University Press.

International focused works
 Crowley, D. (2008). Seeing Japan, Imagining Poland: Polish Art and the Russo-Japanese War. The Russian Review, 67(1), 50-69. 
 Dua, R. (1973). United States and the Russo-Japanese War (1904-5). Proceedings of the Indian History Congress, 34, pp. 273-279. 
 Long, J. (1974). Franco-Russian Relations during the Russo-Japanese War. The Slavonic and East European Review, 52(127), pp. 213-233. 
 May, E. (1957). The Far Eastern Policy of the United States in the Period of the Russo-Japanese War: A Russian View. The American Historical Review, 62(2), pp. 345-351. 
 Morris, E. (2002). Chapter 24: The Best Herder of Emperors Since Napoleon. In Theodore Rex, Google Books. New York, NY: Random House.
 Valliant, R. (1974). The Selling of Japan. Japanese Manipulation of Western Opinion, 1900-1905. Monumenta Nipponica, 29(4), 415-438.
 White, J. A. (2016). Diplomacy of the Russo-Japanese War. Princeton, NJ: Princeton University Press.<></>

Historiography and memory studies
 Cohen, A. (2010). Long Ago and Far Away: War Monuments, Public Relations, and the Memory of the Russo-Japanese War in Russia, 1907-14. The Russian Review, 69(3), 388-411.
 Kowner, R. (2007). Rethinking the Russo-Japanese War, 1904-05: Centennial Perspectives. Boston, MA: Global Oriental.
 Steinberg, J. W. (2008). Was the Russo-Japanese War World War Zero? The Russian Review, 67(1), 1–7. 
 Swafford, K. (2015). "In the Thick of It": The (Meta)Discourse of Jack London's Russo-Japanese War Correspondence. Pacific Coast Philology, 50(1), 82-102.
 Van der Oye, D. (2008). Rewriting the Russo-Japanese War: A Centenary Retrospective. The Russian Review, 67(1), pp. 78–87.

Primary Sources
A limited number of English language primary sources referred to in the above works.
 The Treaty of Portsmouth, 1905 - September 5, 1905. Brigham Young University.
 Correspondence Regarding the Negotiations between Japan and Russia (1903–1904), Presented to the Imperial Diet, March 1904. Japanese Ministry of Foreign Affairs.
 Novikov-Priboy, Aleksei. (1936). Tsushima. New York, NY: Alfred A. Knopf.

Historical Fiction

Filmography

Reference works
 Kowner, R. (2006). Historical Dictionary of the Russo-Japanese War. Lanham, MD. The Scarecrow Press. .

Further reading
Many of the above works contain bibliographies. Included below are a selection of works with large bibliographies related to the Russo-Japanese War.
 Connaughton, R. M. (2003). The War of the Rising Sun and the Tumbling Bear — A Military History of the Russo-Japanese War 1904–5. London: Cassell.

See also
 Foreign policy of the Russian Empire
 Government of Meiji Japan
 Korea under Japanese rule
 Treaty of Portsmouth

References

Notes

Citations

External links
 Google Map with battles of Russo-Japanese War and other important events.
 See more Russo-Japanese War Maps at the Persuasive Cartography, The PJ Mode Collection, Cornell University Library
 The Treaty of Portsmouth and the Russo-Japanese War, 1904–1905. Office of the Historian, United States Secretary of State.

 
Wars involving Japan
Wars involving Russia
Japan–Russia military relations
Russo-Japanese War
Russo-Japanese War